Lala Avtar Narain Gujral (also, Lala Avatar Narayan Gujral) was a politician from Punjab and father of I. K. Gujral, the 12th prime minister of India. He represented the non-Muslim population of West Punjab in the Constituent Assembly of Pakistan for a few months.

Personal life 
Gujral was born in Pari Darwaja, a hamlet about twenty five miles away from Jhelum; he lost his father Duni Chand at an age of sixteen to bubonic plague. Gujral was an alumnus of D.A.V. Lahore, and finished his higher secondary schooling from Jammu; he was a lawyer, by proffession. He was married to Pushpa.

Gujral's son described him as a Hindu reformist who drew inspiration from the Arya Samaj movement and especially, Lala Lajpat Rai.

Political career

British India 
Gujral served as the district-president for the Jhelum unit of the Indian National Congress. He was jailed multiple times by the British Government for engaging in subversive activities.

Pakistan 
As the 1946 Cabinet Mission to India decided on partitioning India, Gujral chose to stay in Pakistan; he was ensured of a harmonious environment by Ghazanfar Ali Khan, a lawyer from Jhelum and a leading League politician. On 4 July 1947, Gujral was elected by the non-Muslim members of the West Punjab section of the (yet-undivided) Punjab Assembly to the Constituent Assembly of Pakistan; he attended the innaugural session on 10 August.

Three days later, the non-Muslim members of the Constituent Assembly met in Gujral's home at Karachi, and formed the "Pakistan Congress"; he was elected as the Chief Whip. Soon, Liaquat Ali Khan, the first prime minister of Pakistan, sent him to Delhi to ensure the safety of Muslims who wished to migrate to Pakistan; while in Delhi, Gujral arranged for the migration of his extended family and esp. the women. He stayed with his son in Karachi for a while, before following suit. A year later, in January 1949, the "Committee on Addition and/or Redistribution of Seats" recommended the dissolution of his seat in the Constituent Assembly.

India 
Gujral settled in Jalandhar; at Nehru's behest, he was appointed as a Judge in the Punjab Industrial Tribunal. He died on 30 May 1976 of cardiac arrest.

Notes

References 

Indian National Congress politicians